Neocalyptis malaysiana is a species of moth of the family Tortricidae. It is found in Malaysia.

References

	

Moths described in 2005
Neocalyptis